Cryptosulidae is a family of bryozoans belonging to the order Cheilostomatida.

Genera:
 Cryptosula Canu & Bassler, 1925
 Cryptosula Vigneaux, 1949
 Harmeria Norman, 1903

References

Bryozoan families